Xenophysella is a genus of moss bug (Peloridiidae). The type species is Xenophysella stewartensis, found only on Stewart Island, off New Zealand.

Species
 Xenophysella greensladeae Burckhardt, 2009
 Xenophysella stewartensis Woodward, 1952 (=Xenophysella pegasusensis Evans, 1982)

References

Other reading
 
 

Coleorrhyncha genera
Peloridiidae